Tianfu Square is a transfer station of the Chengdu Metro on Lines 1 and 2.

Station layout

Around the station
 Tianfu Square
 Chengdu Huangcheng Mosque

Gallery

References

Railway stations in China opened in 2010
Chengdu Metro stations